Albion is an unincorporated community in the Westfield Township of northeastern Surry County, North Carolina, United States.  Prominent landmarks in the community include Albion Missionary Baptist Church and Albion Community Church.

Unincorporated communities in Surry County, North Carolina
Unincorporated communities in North Carolina